A particular church is an ecclesiastical community of faithful headed by a bishop (or equivalent), as defined by Catholic canon law and ecclesiology. A liturgical rite, a collection of liturgies descending from shared historic or regional context, depends on the particular church the bishop (or equivalent) belongs to. Thus "particular church" refers to an institution, and "liturgical rite" to its ritual practices. 

Particular churches exist in two kinds:
 An autonomous particular church sui iuris: an aggregation of particular churches with distinct liturgical, spiritual, theological and canonical traditions. The largest such autonomous particular church is the Latin Church. The other 23 Eastern Catholic Churches are headed by bishops, some of which are titled Patriarch or Major Archbishop. In this context the descriptors autonomous and sui iuris (Latin) are synonymous, meaning "of its own law".
 A local particular church: a diocese (or eparchy) headed by a bishop (or equivalent), typically collected in a national polity under an episcopal conference. However, there are also other forms, including  apostolic vicariates, apostolic prefectures, military ordinariates, personal ordinariates, personal prelatures, and territorial abbacies.

Liturgical rites also exist in two kinds:
 Liturgical rite: a liturgical rite depending on the tradition of an autonomous particular church sui iuris. Catholic liturgies are broadly divided into the Latin liturgical rites of the Latin Church and the various Eastern Catholic liturgies of the other 23 sui iuris churches
 Catholic order liturgical rite: a variant of a liturgical rite exceptionately depending on a specific religious order

Churches

List of churches sui iuris

Ecclesiology 

In Catholic ecclesiology, a church is an assembly of the faithful, hierarchically ordered, both in the entire world (the Catholic Church), or in a certain territory (a particular church). To be a sacrament (a sign) of the Mystical Body of Christ in the world, a church must have both a head and members (Col. 1:18). The sacramental sign of Christ the head is the sacred hierarchy – the bishops, priests and deacons. 

More specifically, it is the local bishop, with his priests and deacons gathered around and assisting him in his office of teaching, sanctifying and governing (Mt. 28:19–20; Titus 1:4–9). Thus, the church is fully present sacramentally (by way of a sign) wherever there is a sign of Christ the head, a bishop and those who assist him, and a sign of Christ's body, Christian faithful. Each diocese is therefore considered a particular church. 

On the worldwide level, the sign of Christ the head is the Pope, and, to be Catholic, particular churches, whether local churches or autonomous ritual churches, must be in communion with this sign of Christ the head. Through this full communion with Saint Peter and his successors the church becomes a universal sacrament of salvation to the end of the age (Mt. 28:20).

The word "church" is applied to the Catholic Church as a whole, which is seen as a single church: the multitude of peoples and cultures within the church, and the great diversity of gifts, offices, conditions and ways of life of its members, are not opposed to the church's unity. In this sense of "church", the list of churches in the Catholic Church has only one member, the Catholic Church itself (comprising Roman and Eastern Churches).

Within the Catholic Church there are local particular churches, of which dioceses are the most familiar form. Other forms include territorial abbacies, apostolic vicariates and apostolic prefectures. The 1983 Code of Canon Law states: "Particular Churches, in which and from which the one and only Catholic Church exists, are principally dioceses. Unless the contrary is clear, the following are equivalent to a diocese: a territorial prelature, a territorial abbacy, a vicariate apostolic, a prefecture apostolic and a permanently established apostolic administration." A list of Catholic dioceses, of which on 31 December 2011 there were 2,834, is given at List of Catholic dioceses (alphabetical).

Within the Catholic Church there are also aggregations of local particular churches that share a specific liturgical, theological, spiritual, and canonical heritage, distinguished from other heritages on the basis of cultural and historical circumstances. These are known as autonomous ("sui iuris") churches. The 1990 Code of Canons of the Eastern Churches defines such a church as follows: "A group of Christ's faithful hierarchically linked in accordance with law and given express or tacit recognition by the supreme authority of the Church is in this Code called an autonomous Church." There are 24 such autonomous Catholic churches: One Latin Church (i.e., Western) and 23 Eastern Catholic Churches", a distinction by now more historical than geographical. Although each of them has its own specific heritage, they are all in full communion with the Pope in Rome.

Unlike "families" or "federations" of churches formed through the grant of mutual recognition by distinct ecclesial bodies, the Catholic Church considers itself a single church ("full communion, "one Body") composed of a multitude of particular churches, each of which, as stated, is an embodiment of the fullness of the one Catholic Church. For the particular churches within the Catholic Church, whether autonomous ritual churches (e.g., Coptic Catholic Church, Melkite Catholic Church, Armenian Catholic Church, etc.) or dioceses (e.g., Archdiocese of Birmingham, Archdiocese of Chicago, etc.), are seen as not simply branches, divisions or sections of a larger body. Theologically, each is considered to be the embodiment in a particular place or for a particular community of the one, whole Catholic Church. "It is in these and formed out of them that the one and unique Catholic Church exists."

Particular churches sui iuris 

There are 24 autonomous churches: one Latin Church and twenty-three Eastern Catholic Churches, a distinction by now more historical than geographical. The term sui iuris means, literally, "of its own law", or self-governing. Although all of the particular churches espouse the same beliefs and faith, their distinction lies in their varied expression of that faith through their traditions, disciplines, and canon law. All are in communion with the Holy See.

For this kind of particular church, the 1983 Code of Canon Law uses the unambiguous phrase "autonomous ritual Church". The 1990 Code of Canons of the Eastern Churches, which is concerned principally with what the Second Vatican Council called "particular Churches or rites", shortened this to "autonomous Church".

Local particular churches
In Catholic teaching, each diocese (Latin Church term) or eparchy (Eastern term) is also a local or particular church, though it lacks the autonomy of the autonomous churches described above:

The 1983 Code of Canon Law, which is concerned with the Latin Church alone and so with only one autonomous particular church, uses the term "particular Church" only in the sense of "local Church", as in its Canon 373:

The standard form of these local or particular churches, each of which is headed by a bishop, is called a diocese in the Latin Church and an eparchy in the Eastern churches. At the end of 2011, the total number of all these jurisdictional areas (or "sees") was 2,834.

Local particular church of Rome

The Holy See, the Diocese of Rome, is seen as the central local church. The bishop, the Pope, is considered to be, in a unique sense, the successor of Saint Peter, the chief (or "prince") of the apostles. Quoting the Second Vatican Council's document Lumen gentium, the Catechism of the Catholic Church states: "The Pope, Bishop of Rome and Peter's successor, 'is the perpetual and visible source and foundation of the unity both of the bishops and of the whole company of the faithful.

All the Catholic particular churches, whether Latin or Eastern, local or autonomous—are by definition in full communion with the Holy See of Rome.

Rites 

The Code of Canons of the Eastern Churches defines "rite" as follows: "Rite is the liturgical, theological, spiritual and disciplinary heritage, distinguished according to peoples' culture and historical circumstances, that finds expression in each autonomous church's way of living the faith."

As thus defined, "rite" concerns not only a people's liturgy (manner of worship), but also its theology (understanding of doctrine), spirituality (prayer and devotion), and discipline (canon law).

In this sense of the word "rite", the list of rites within the Catholic Church is identical with that of the autonomous churches, each of which has its own heritage, which distinguishes that church from others, and membership of a church involves participation in its liturgical, theological, spiritual and disciplinary heritage. However, "church" refers to the people, and "rite" to their heritage.

The Code of Canons of the Eastern Churches states that the rites with which it is concerned (but which it does not list) spring from the following five traditions: Alexandrian, Antiochian, Armenian, Chaldean, and Constantinopolitan. Since it covers only Eastern Catholic churches and rites, it does not mention those of Western (Latin) tradition.

The word "rite" is sometimes used with reference only to liturgy, ignoring the theological, spiritual and disciplinary elements in the heritage of the churches. In this sense, "rite" has been defined as "the whole complex of the (liturgical) services of any Church or group of Churches".

Between "rites" in this exclusively liturgical sense and the autonomous churches there is no strict correspondence, such as there is when "rite" is understood as in the Code of Canons of the Eastern Churches. The 14 autonomous churches of Byzantine tradition have a single liturgical rite, but vary mainly in liturgical language, while on the contrary the single Latin Church has several distinct liturgical rites, whose universal main form, the Roman Rite, is practised in Latin or in the local vernacular).

Latin (Western) rites

Eastern rites

See also 
 Autocephaly
 Catholic Church by country
 Index of Catholic Church articles
 List of Catholic dioceses (structured view)

References

Notes

Citations

Further reading

External links 
 GigaCatholic Catholic Rites/Particular Chutches

 
 
Catholic Church-related lists